Mohamed Hammed (born 23 September 1987) is a Tunisian archer. He competed in the men's individual event at the 2020 Summer Olympics.

In 2019, he won the silver medal in the men's recurve event at the African Games held in Rabat, Morocco. He also won the silver medal in the men's team recurve event.

References

External links

1987 births
Living people
Tunisian male archers
African Games silver medalists for Tunisia
African Games medalists in archery
Competitors at the 2019 African Games
Olympic archers of Tunisia
Archers at the 2020 Summer Olympics
Place of birth missing (living people)
21st-century Tunisian people